The University of Washington College of Engineering (UW Engineering) is the engineering school of the university. In autumn 2018, the college had an enrollment of 8,125 students.

History
Founded in 1901.

Faculty of UW Engineering have included 27 members of the National Academy of Engineering, 32 Sloan Foundation Research Award recipients, and two MacArthur Foundation Fellows.

 From 2012 to 2017, 85 companies were started by UW engineering students and faculty or technology. 
 Over 50% of UW startups in FY18 came from the College of Engineering. 
 UW-sponsored research totals over $1B annually. 
 From 2012 to 2017, 1,128 innovations were reported and 1,824 patents were filed. 
 Engineering research expenditures totaled $153M in FY18. 
 In FY18, industry-sponsored research for UW Engineering totaled $14.6M.

In autumn 2017, the college began a "Direct to College" admission process by which prospective freshman can apply directly to the college to be assured a place in an engineering major. Accepted students must still meet minimum progress requirements to enter a major. The process was created in response to the growing competition at the college, where fewer than half of undergraduates who apply to major in engineering are accepted.

References

Colleges, schools, and departments of the University of Washington
Educational institutions established in 1901
1901 establishments in Washington (state)
Engineering schools and colleges in the United States